Rafał Dębski (born 1969)  is a Polish writer of fantasy, historic, sensational and criminal novels. He works as a psychologist. Since June 2009 he has been editor in chief of the magazine Science Fiction, Fantasy and Horror.

He debuted in Nowa Fantastyka in its May 1998 issue with his tale "Siódmy liść".

In 2005 his first novel Łzy Nemezis was published. In the scope of fantasy literature he won the "Nautilus" award in 2007 for his novel Czarny Pergamin and in 2008 for Gwiazdozbiór kata. He published a series of criminal novels, in which the main character is police officer Michał Wroński. He also wrote a novel which takes place during the Russo-Chechen conflict.

Bibliography

Books
Łzy Nemesis, Copernicus Corporation, October 2005
Czarny Pergamin, Fabryka Słów, October 2006
Przy końcu drogi, Fantasmagoricon, October 2006
Gwiazdozbiór kata, Wydawnictwo Dolnośląskie, May 2007
Kiedy Bóg zasypia, Fabryka Słów, June 2007
Pasterz upiorów, zbiór opowiadań, Fantasmagoricon, November 2007
Wilki i Orły, Red Horse, February 2008
Słońce we krwi, Red Horse, October 2008
Serce teściowej, zbiór opowiadań, Fabryka Słów, November 2008
Wilkozacy. Wilcze Prawo 
Wilkozacy. Krew z krwi

Series about police officer Wroński
Labirynt von Brauna, Wydawnictwo Dolnośląskie, February 2007
Żelazne kamienie, Wydawnictwo Dolnośląskie, September 2007
Krzyże na rozstajach, Wydawnictwo Dolnośląskie, September 2008

References

1969 births
Polish crime writers
Polish crime fiction writers
Living people
Place of birth missing (living people)
20th-century Polish writers
21st-century Polish writers
20th-century Polish male writers